Ushi Cliffs (‘Skat Ushi’ \'skat u-'shi\) are the precipitous rocky cliffs extending 2.7 km in northwest-southeast direction and 600 m wide, rising to 1500 m on Oscar II Coast in Graham Land.  They are situated in the south foothills of Roundel Dome, surmounting upper Flask Glacier to the south.  Named after the settlement of Ushi in Western Bulgaria.

Location
British mapping in 1976.

Maps
 British Antarctic Territory.  Scale 1:200000 topographic map.  DOS 610 Series, Sheet W 65 62.  Directorate of Overseas Surveys, Tolworth, UK, 1976.
 Antarctic Digital Database (ADD). Scale 1:250000 topographic map of Antarctica. Scientific Committee on Antarctic Research (SCAR). Since 1993, regularly upgraded and updated.

Notes

References
 Ushi Cliffs. SCAR Composite Antarctic Gazetteer.
 Bulgarian Antarctic Gazetteer. Antarctic Place-names Commission. (details in Bulgarian, basic data in English)

External links
 Ushi Cliffs. Copernix satellite image

Cliffs of Graham Land
Oscar II Coast
Bulgaria and the Antarctic